"Thou shalt not commit adultery" is found in the Book of Exodus of the Hebrew Bible. It is considered the sixth commandment by Roman Catholic and Lutheran authorities, but the seventh by Jewish and most Protestant authorities. What constitutes adultery is not plainly defined in this passage of the Bible, and has been the subject of debate within Judaism and Christianity. The word fornication means illicit sex, prostitution, idolatry and lawlessness.

Religious views

Judaism

The mitzvah against adultery is interpreted to refer to sexual relations between a man and a married woman. The mitzvah are as follows:
 Not to have intercourse with another man's wife.
 There shall be no intercourse with a woman, without previous marriage with a deed of marriage and formal declaration of marriage.

In the Torah, if a husband suspected his wife of adultery, there was a prescribed ordeal she underwent to determine her guilt or innocence. A separate procedure was to be followed if a newly-wed husband became suspicious that his wife had been promiscuous before marriage. Alternatively, to enforce capital punishment for adultery, at least two witnesses were required, and both the man and woman involved were subject to punishment. While cases of adultery could thus be difficult to prove, divorce laws added over the years enabled a husband to divorce his wife on circumstantial evidence of adultery, without witnesses or additional evidence. If a woman committed unlawful intercourse against her will, she was not guilty of adultery, because she did not act as a free agent. Punishment was not inflicted in such cases, and the legal consequences of adultery did not follow.

In the first century, enforcement of the ordeal of the bitter water became less common, as additional restrictions were put on prosecution of capital cases of adultery. In the year 40, before the destruction of the Second Temple, the Jewish courts relinquished their right to inflict capital punishment. Changes in punishment for adultery were enacted: The adulterer was scourged, and the husband of the adulteress was not allowed to forgive her crime, but was compelled to divorce her, and she lost all her property rights under her marriage contract. The adulteress was not allowed to marry the one with whom she had committed adultery; if she did, they were forced to separate.

Although legal enforcement was inconsistently applied, the mitzvah remained. Adultery is one of three sins (along with blasphemy / idolatry and murder) that are to be resisted to the point of death. This was the consensus of the rabbis at the meeting at Lydda, during the Bar Kokhba revolt of 132.

The mitzvah to practice sexual relations only within marriage is affirmed by Orthodox, Conservative, and Reform rabbis into modern times. They point out that sexual relations outside of marriage undermine marriage and even love itself, and also emphasize the positive role of sexual relations in strengthening and promoting love within marriage.

Christianity

In the New Testament
In the gospels, Jesus affirmed the commandment against adultery and seemed to extend it, saying, "But I say to you, anyone who looks on a woman to lust after her has committed adultery with her already in his heart." He taught his audience that the outward act of adultery does not happen apart from sins of the heart: "From within people, from their hearts, come evil thoughts, unchastity, theft, murder, adultery, greed, malice, deceit, licentiousness, envy, blasphemy, arrogance, folly. All these evils come from within and they defile." However, some commentators, including Thomas Aquinas, say that Jesus was making the connection with the commandment, "You shall not covet your neighbor's wife."

According to the gospels, Jesus quoted the book of Genesis regarding the divine origin of the marriage relationship, concluding, "So they are no longer two, but one flesh. Therefore, what God has joined together, no man must separate." Jesus dismissed expedient provisions allowing for divorce for nearly any reason, and cited sexual immorality (a breaking of the marriage covenant) as the only reason why a person may divorce without committing adultery. The Apostle Paul similarly taught (commonly called the Pauline privilege):

In the gospel of John is an account of a woman caught in adultery. Leaders responsible for executing justice brought her to Jesus and asked for his judgment. Jesus clearly identified adultery with sin; however, his statement "Let him who is without sin cast the first stone" did not refer to the precepts of law but to conscience. Some commentators point out that if the woman was caught in adultery, there should also have been a man standing trial. The law clearly stated that both parties were to receive the death penalty. By not bringing the guilty man to justice, these leaders shared in the guilt and were not fit to carry out the punishment.  Not condoning her adultery, Jesus warns the woman in parting, "Go and sin no more"

The Apostle Paul wrote frankly about the gravity of adultery:

Within marriage, regular sexual relations are expected and encouraged. "The husband should give to his wife her conjugal rights, and likewise the wife to her husband. For the wife does not have authority over her own body, but the husband does. Likewise the husband does not have authority over his own body, but the wife does."  As "one flesh," the husband and wife share this right and privilege; the New Testament does not portray intimacy as something held in reserve by each spouse to be shared on condition. "Stop depriving one another, except by agreement for a time that you may devote yourselves to prayer, and come together again lest Satan tempt you because of your lack of self-control." A stated reason for maintaining marital relations is to reduce the temptation to adultery.

Scripture itself states that Paul was unmarried, but does not clarify whether he never married or was widowed. Nevertheless, they point out he realized the practical advantages of remaining single. He referred to contentment in celibacy as "a gift," and sexual desire as the more common condition of people. For this reason, he recommends that most people are better off married, in order to preclude being tempted beyond what they can bear or going through life "burning with passion."

Catholic Church

According to the Catechism of the Catholic Church, those who are engaged must refrain from sexual relations until after the marriage ceremony.  This exercise of restraint in order to keep the commandment against adultery is also seen as important practice for fidelity within marriage:

The tradition of the Catholic Church has understood the commandment against adultery as encompassing the whole of human sexuality and so pornography is declared a violation of this commandment.  Several other sexual activities that may or may not involve married persons are also directly addressed and prohibited in the Catechism.

Adultery is viewed not only as a sin between an individual and God but as an injustice that reverberates through society by harming its fundamental unit, the family:

The catechism of the Council of Trent (Part III), published in 1566, defined adultery even more strictly than at present, stating "This commandment, then, resolves itself into two heads; the one expressed, which prohibits adultery; the other implied, which inculcates purity of mind and body." Thus linking the commandment against adultery to the sin of lust in general.

Reformation and post-Reformation commentary
John Calvin understood the commandment against adultery to extend to sexual relations outside of marriage:

Matthew Henry understood the commandment against adultery to prohibit sexual immorality in general, and he acknowledged the difficulty people experience: "This commandment forbids all acts of uncleanness, with all those fleshly lusts which produce those acts and war against the soul."  Henry supports his interpretation with Matthew 5:28, where Jesus warns that whoever looks at a woman lustfully has already committed adultery with her in his heart. 

Regarding the above passage, Matthew Henry comments:

John Wesley believed this scripture and the sure judgment of God, even though adulterers "frequently escape the sentence of men."

Martin Luther observed that there were many more people in his day who were unmarried for various reasons than in biblical times, which condition increased both temptation and sexual activities that are displeasing to God:  

Luther neither condemns nor denies human sexuality, but, like the Apostle Paul, points out that God instituted the marriage relationship to provide for its proper enjoyment. Luther comments that each spouse should intentionally cherish the other, and that this will contribute to love and a desire for chastity, which will make fidelity easier.  

The so-called "Wicked Bible", printed in 1631, omits the word "not", reading "Thou shalt commit adultery." Historians are divided as to whether this was a typographical error or the attempt of a competitor to sabotage the print-run.

Islam
Adultery is mentioned in Surat Al-Isra' of the Quran:

Muhammad said that a person is a nonbeliever while he or she is committing adultery.

References

External links
 Tanakh (Holy Scriptures), Jewish Publication Society (JPS) 1917

Ten Commandments
Biblical phrases
Negative Mitzvoth
Sexuality in the Bible